The 20th TCA Awards were presented by the Television Critics Association. Bill Maher hosted the ceremony on July 17, 2004 at the Century Plaza Hotel.

Winners and nominees

Multiple wins 
The following shows received multiple wins:

Multiple nominations 
The following shows received multiple nominations:

References

External links
Official website
2004 TCA Awards at IMDb.com

2004 television awards
2004 in American television
TCA Awards ceremonies